Novofyodorovka is a rural locality (a village) in Satyyevsky Selsoviet, Miyakinsky District, Bashkortostan, Russia. The population was 63 as of 2010. There are two streets.

Geography 
Novofyodorovka is located 24 km southwest of Kirgiz-Miyaki (the district's administrative centre) by road. Satyevo is the nearest rural locality.

References 

Rural localities in Miyakinsky District